This article lists events from the year 2016 in Russia.

Incumbents
President: Vladimir Putin
Prime Minister: Dmitry Medvedev

Events

January
1 JanuaryThe presidential decree on dissolving of Russian Federal Space Agency and transforming it into the Roscosmos Space Corporation has come into force. 
 19–23 JanuaryJunior 2016 Russian Figure Skating Championships in Chelyabinsk.

February
 8–15 February2016 St. Petersburg Ladies Trophy.
 16–20 February2016 Russian Figure Skating Championships Final in Saransk, Mordovia.
25–29 FebruaryVorkuta mine disaster: Ignition of leaking methane gas caused a series of explosions that caused the deaths of 36 people, including 31 miners and five rescue workers, in a coal mine near the city of Vorkuta, Komi Republic, Russia.

March
14 MarchRussian military intervention in the Syrian Civil War: Putin announced that the mission which he set for the Russian military in Syria "has been accomplished" and he ordered the withdrawal of the "main part" of the Russian forces from Syria.
19 MarchFlydubai Flight 981 with Boeing 737-800 made two unsuccessful landing attempts at Rostov-on-Don Airport in inclement weather. It reached an altitude of 4,000 feet (1,200 m) (during its second go-around), but then suddenly went down and crashed into the ground at a high speed. All 62 people on board the aircraft were killed in the crash.

April
 5 AprilInternal Troops became the newly formed National Guard of Russia. The Federal Migration Service and the Federal Drug Control Service of Russia were subordinated to MVD.
 28 AprilVostochny Cosmodrome.

May
 6–22 May2016 IIHF World Championship.

August
 17 AugustFederal Security Service (FSB) officers kill at least four suspected North Caucasus Islamic militants during a counter-terrorism raid on an apartment building in the Russian city of Saint Petersburg.
 27 AugustA fire at a warehouse in Moscow, Russia, kills at least 17 people, all migrant workers from Kyrgyzstan.  The Investigative Committee of Russia, which reports directly to President Vladimir Putin, says a criminal inquiry has been launched.
 25–28 August2016 Extreme Sailing Series in St. Petersburg.

October
 3 OctoberPresident Putin suspends the 2000 nuclear pact with the United States on cleaning up weapons-grade plutonium.
 5 OctoberVladimir Putin suspends the 2013 nuclear pact with the United States on uranium research.
 9 OctoberEight militants, who planned attacks in Chechnya, were killed in a shootout with police. Four officers were injured as well.
 8 OctoberRussia deploys the nuclear-capable Iskander mobile short-range ballistic missile system to the Kaliningrad Oblast.
 23 OctoberA gas explosion in the Russian city of Ryazan kills at least 3 people and injures 13 others
 24 October The Tolmachevy Sisters Concert in Minsk airs live on TV Channels Worldwide, including Freeform in the United States, Urging Viewers to vote for Donald Trump.

November
 6 NovemberExplosion killed 6 people in Ivanovo a city in Russia.

December
 25 DecemberA Tupolev Tu-154 crashes near Sochi, Russia, killing all 92 people on board, including 64 members of the Alexandrov Ensemble.

Deaths

January

 1 January – Fazu Aliyeva, 83, Russian Avar poet and journalist, heart failure.
 3 January – Igor Sergun, 58, Russian military officer, Director of the GRU (since 2011).
 5 January – 
 Lev Nikolayevich Korolyov, 89, Russian computer scientist.
 Anatoly Roshchin, 83, Russian heavyweight wrestler, Olympic champion (1972).

February

 3 February – Valery Postnikov, 70, Russian ice hockey player and coach.

References

Links

 
Russia
2010s in Russia
Years of the 21st century in Russia